= Rabbania =

Coordinates: 30°53′41″N 72°39′8″E

Jamia Dar Ul Uloom Rabbania is an Islamic madrasa in Punjab.

It has hundreds of ulama and Fuzala sending the message of the Quran and Hadith. In 1940, the foundation was created by Ch Shah Muhammad and Maulvi Fazal Kareem, who are famous in the area.

The construction was begun by a local religious person, Molana Fazal Ahmad Ray Pori. The first Dars-e-Hadees was started by the director of Dar-Ul-Uloom Deoband, Qari Muhammad Tayyab. Dora Hadees was started at Jamia in 1948 and issued Qal-Allah and Qal-UI-Rasool thereafter.
